The Executive Council of the African Union is made up of ministers designated by the governments of member countries. They discuss issues of concern and prepare material for the Assembly, to whom they are responsible. They make decisions on five different topics:

 foreign trade 
 social security 
 food 
 agriculture  
 communications.

Decisions of the Executive Council

 The Executive Council shall take its decisions by consensus or, failing which, by a two-thirds majority of the Member States. However, procedural matters, including the question of whether a matter is one of procedure or not, shall be decided by a simple majority.
 Two-thirds of the total membership of the Union shall form a quorum at any meeting of the Executive Council.

External links
 Executive Council of the African Union

 
Intergovernmental organizations